Viasat Sport N ("N" as in "Norway") was the name of a former sports channel which broadcast to Norway. The channel launched on 29 November 2005, as a replacement for the then pan-Nordic Viasat Sport 1 channel in Norway.

The channel was a joint venture between Modern Times Group and Norsk Rikskringkasting. In addition to live sport coverage SportN showcased classic sport.

The channel closed down when Viasat launched Viasat Fotball on 15 September 2009.

Its technical base was located at Bjerke, Oslo.

V Sport
Defunct television channels in Norway
Modern Times Group
Television channels and stations established in 2005
Television channels and stations disestablished in 2009